Charles-Philippe, marquis de Chennevières-Pointel, known as Jean de Falaise (23 July 1820, Falaise – 1 April 1899) was a French writer and art historian.

Life and career
Chennevières was a learned connoisseur and collected thousands of French drawings from 1500 to 1860.  His friends included Charles Baudelaire, Theophile Gautier and the Goncourt brothers.  He served in the arts administration of the Second Empire (1851-1870).  He joined the Louvre in 1846, and later became its curator from 1852 to 1870, and was responsible for the Fine Arts exhibition at the 1855 Paris World's Fair.  In 1873, Chennevières became the Director of the national École des Beaux-Arts (School of Fine Arts).

From March 8 to June 7, 2007, selections from his collection of drawings were the subject of an exhibition at the Louvre museum, "Philippe de Chennevières - Collector of French 19th Century Drawings".

Works 

 Essai politique d’un cousin de Charlotte Corday, Nogent-le-Rotrou, Gouverneur, 1871 ;
 Essais sur l’histoire de la peinture française, Paris, 1894 ;
 Essais sur l’organisation des arts en Province, Paris, J.-B. Dumoulin, 1852 ;
 Historiettes baguenaudières par un Normand, Aix, Aubin, 1845  ;
 Inauguration de la statue de Nicolas Poussin aux Andelys, Argentan, Barbier, 1851 ;
 Les Décorations du Panthéon, Paris, l’Artiste, 1885 ;
 Les Derniers Contes de Jean de Falaise, 1860;
 Lettres rurales, Mamers, J. Fleury, 1872 ;
 Lettres sur l’art français en 1850, Argentan, Barbier, 1851 ;
 Notes d’un compilateur sur les sculpteurs et les sculptures en ivoire, Amiens, Lenoel-Herourt, 1857 ;
 Notice historique et descriptive sur la Galerie d’Apollon au Louvre, Paris, Pillet fils aîné, 1851 ;
 Notice sur M. le Bon Taylor, Paris, Firmin-Didot, 1881 ;
 Portraits inédits d’artistes français, Paris, Vignères, Rapilly, 1855-69 ;
 V. Le Harivel-Durocher, Bellême, G. Levayer, 1898 ;
 Souvenirs d’un directeur des beaux-arts, Paris, L’Artiste, 1883-1889 ; réimp. Paris, Arthéna, 2001 ;
 Suzanne ou la terre normande, Paris, L’Artiste, 1883-1889 ; réimp. Paris, Arthéna, 2001 ;
 Notice sur la galerie d’Apollon, 1851;
 Essai sur l’organisation des arts en province, 1852;
 Les Aventures du petit roi saint Louis devant Bellesme, 1865;
 Contes percherons, Nogent-le-Rotrou, 1869;
 Les Caprices de Manette, 1878;
 Les Dessins de maires anciens, exposés à l’École des Beaux-Arts en 1879, 1880;
 Les Dessins du Louvre, 1882–1884.

References

External links
 

1820 births
1899 deaths
People from Falaise, Calvados
French art historians
French male non-fiction writers